Fort Walton Beach High School is a secondary school located in the center of Fort Walton Beach, Florida. John Spolski is the current principal. Placement classes have an open enrollment policy.  The athletic program offers football, basketball, soccer, wrestling, softball, baseball, swimming, cross country, track, volleyball, girls and boys weightlifting. The Vikings have won two state championships in football, two state championships in girls basketball, and one state championship in boys weightlifting.

Fort Walton Beach High School serves residents of Fort Walton Beach, Navarre Mary Esther, Crestview and Destin.

Notable alumni
Glen Coffee - running back for the San Francisco 49ers
John Egbunu (born 1994) - Nigerian-born American basketball player for Hapoel Jerusalem of the Israeli Basketball Premier League
Amos Fowler - center for the Detroit Lions from 1978-1984
E. G. Green - wide receiver for the Indianapolis Colts from 1998-2000
Mike James (baseball) - Major League Baseball pitcher for the California Angels, St. Louis Cardinals, and the Colorado Rockies
Cliff Lewis - linebacker for the Green Bay Packers from 1981-1984
Demetria McKinney - actress and singer
Deiontrez Mount - linebacker for the Denver Broncos
Dyron Nix - professional basketball player
Akeem Spence - defensive end for the New England Patriots
Danny Wuerffel - won Heisman Trophy in 1996 as the quarterback of the Florida Gators

References

External links 
 Official Fort Walton Beach High School site
 Fort Walton Beach Viking Band site

Fort Walton Beach, Florida
High schools in Okaloosa County, Florida
Public high schools in Florida
Okaloosa County School District
Education in Okaloosa County, Florida
1935 establishments in Florida
Educational institutions established in 1935